House of Assembly elections were held in Tobago on 23 January 2017. The result was a victory for the People's National Movement, which won ten of the twelve seats in the Tobago House of Assembly.

Results

Control

Voting-seating comparison

References

Tobago
2017
2017 in Trinidad and Tobago